The Secrest Octagon Barn is a historic building located near Downey in rural Johnson County, Iowa, United States. It was constructed in 1883 by master builder George Frank Longerbean for Joshua Hunt Secrest as a hay barn-horse stable. The octagonal barn measures  in diameter. It features red vertical siding and a sectional bell shaped roof that is supported by hand-laminated beams. The octagon-shaped cupola has the same roof shape as the barn. It was listed on the National Register of Historic Places in 1974.

According to the builder's great grandson, the builder's name is Longerbeam.

References

External links
 Joshua Hunt Secrest, an autobiography

Infrastructure completed in 1883
Buildings and structures in Johnson County, Iowa
National Register of Historic Places in Johnson County, Iowa
Barns on the National Register of Historic Places in Iowa
Octagon barns in the United States